Singing News Radio is a radio format programmed and produced by Salem Radio Networks. It targets the 25-54 adult Christian listener demographic. This radio format has a carefully selected mix of Southern gospel music from artists such as The Blackwood Brothers, Gold City, Kurt Young, The Oak Ridge Boys, The Hoppers and Young Harmony.  The format was originally named Solid Gospel until September 2017 when it was renamed for a periodical devoted to Southern gospel music, The Singing News, now published by Salem Media Group.

Affiliates
WKRK (AM), Murphy, North Carolina
WXAN, Ava, Illinois
WZOT, Rockmart, Georgia (Part Time Affiliate)
WAEY, Princeton, WV

Competitor networks
Singing News Radio has no direct competitor network featuring Southern Gospel music, although Rejoice! Musical Soul Food by Urban Choice Media plays urban gospel or "black gospel" music.

External links
Salem Music Network - singing news radio

American radio networks
Radio formats
Salem Media Group properties
Southern Gospel radio stations in the United States